Madeira, officially the Autonomous Region of Madeira, is one of two autonomous regions of Portugal, the other being the Azores. Madeira is geologically located on the African Tectonic Plate, although its people are descended from Portuguese settlers. Its population was 251,060 in 2021. The capital of Madeira is Funchal, which is located on the main island's south coast.

The archipelago includes the islands of Madeira, Porto Santo, and the Desertas, administered together with the separate archipelago of the Savage Islands. Roughly half of the region's population lives in Funchal. The region has political and administrative autonomy through the Administrative Political Statute of the Autonomous Region of Madeira provided for in the Portuguese Constitution. The autonomous region is an integral part of the European Union as an outermost region. Madeira generally has a very mild and moderate subtropical climate with mediterranean summer droughts and winter rain. Many microclimates are found at different elevations.

Madeira, originally uninhabited, was claimed by Portuguese sailors in the service of Prince Henry the Navigator in 1419 and settled after 1420. The archipelago is considered to be the first territorial discovery of the exploratory period of the Age of Discovery.

Madeira is a popular year-round resort, particularly for fellow Portuguese, but also British (148,000 visits in 2021), and Germans (113,000). It is by far the most populous and densely populated Portuguese island. The region is noted for its Madeira wine, flora, fauna, with its pre-historic laurel forest classified as a UNESCO World Heritage Site. The main harbour in Funchal has long been the leading Portuguese port in cruise liner dockings, an important stopover for Atlantic passenger cruises between Europe, the Caribbean and North Africa. In addition, the International Business Centre of Madeira, also known as the Madeira Free Trade Zone, was created formally in the 1980s as a tool of regional economic policy. It consists of a set of incentives, mainly tax-related, granted with the objective of attracting foreign direct investment based on international services into Madeira.

History

Ancient
Plutarch in his Parallel Lives (Sertorius, 75 AD) referring to the military commander Quintus Sertorius (d. 72 BC), relates that after his return to Cádiz, he met sailors who spoke of idyllic Atlantic islands: "The islands are said to be two in number separated by a very narrow strait and lie  from Africa. They are called the Isles of the Blessed."

Archaeological evidence suggests that the islands may have been visited by the Vikings sometime between 900 and 1030.

Accounts by Muhammad al-Idrisi state that the Mugharrarin came across an island where they found "a huge quantity of sheep, the meat of which was bitter and inedible" before going to the more incontrovertibly inhabited Canary Islands. This island, possibly Madeira or Hierro, must have been inhabited or previously visited by people for livestock to be present.

Legend
During the reign of King Edward III of England, lovers Robert Machim and Anna d'Arfet were said to have fled from England to France in 1346. Driven off course by a violent storm, their ship ran aground along the coast of an island that may have been Madeira. Later this legend was the basis of the naming of the city of Machico on the island, in memory of the young lovers.

European exploration
Madeira is described in various medieval manuscripts: the Book of Knowledge of All Kingdoms of early 14th century, the Medici-Laurentian Atlas of 1351, in Soleri Portolani of 1380 and 1385 and Corbitis Atlas of late 14th century; under names such as Lecmane, Lolegname and Legnami (the isle of wood); Puerto or Porto Santo; desierta, deserte or deserta. It is widely accepted that knowledge of these Atlantic islands existed before their more documented and successful settlement by the Portuguese Empire.

In 1418, two captains under service to Prince Henry the Navigator, João Gonçalves Zarco and Tristão Vaz Teixeira, were driven off course by a storm to an island they named Porto Santo (English: holy harbour) in gratitude for divine deliverance from a shipwreck. The following year, an organised expedition, under the captaincy of Zarco, Vaz Teixeira, and Bartolomeu Perestrello, traveled to the island to claim it on behalf of the Portuguese Crown. Subsequently, the new settlers observed "a heavy black cloud suspended to the southwest." Their investigation revealed it to be the larger island they called Madeira.

Settlement

The first Portuguese settlers began colonizing the islands around 1420 or 1425. The first settlers were the three captain-donees and their respective families, a small group of members of the gentry, people of modest conditions and some former inmates of the kingdom.

The settlement involved people from all over the kingdom. It was from the Algarve that some of the early settlers set out. Many came with the important task of the landlord system employment. Servants, squires, knights and noblemen are identified as the ones who secured the beginning of the settlement. Later on, settlers came from the north of Portugal, namely from the region of Entre Douro and Minho, who intervened specifically in the organization of the agricultural area.

Majority of settlers were fishermen and peasant farmers, who willingly left Portugal for a new life on the islands, a better one, they hoped, than was possible in a Portugal which had been ravaged by the Black Death and where the best farmlands were strictly controlled by the nobility.

To have minimum conditions for the development of agriculture on the island, the settlers had to chop down part of the dense forest and build a large number of water channels, called “levadas”, to carry the abundant waters on the north coast to the south coast of the island. 

Initially, the settlers produced wheat for their own sustenance but later began to export wheat to mainland Portugal. In earlier times, fish and vegetables were the settlers' main means of subsistence.

Grain production began to fall and the ensuing crisis forced Henry the Navigator to order other commercial crops to be planted so that the islands could be profitable. These specialised plants, and their associated industrial technology, created one of the major revolutions on the islands and fuelled Portuguese industry. Following the introduction of the first water-driven sugar mill on Madeira, sugar production increased to over 6,000 arrobas (an arroba was equal to ) by 1455, using advisers from Sicily and financed by Genoese capital. (Genoa acted as an integral part of the island economy until the 17th century.) The accessibility of Madeira attracted Genoese and Flemish traders, who were keen to bypass Venetian monopolies.
Sugarcane production was the primary engine of the island's economy which quickly afforded the Funchal metropolis economic prosperity. The production of sugar cane attracted adventurers and merchants from all parts of Europe, especially Italians, Basques, Catalans, and Flemish. This meant that, in the second half of the fifteenth century, the city of Funchal became a mandatory port of call for European trade routes.

Slaves were used during the island's period of sugar trade to cultivate sugar cane alongside paid workers, though slave owners were only a small minority of the Madeiran population, and those who did own slaves owned only a few. Slaves consisted of Guanches from the nearby Canary islands, captured Berbers from the conquest of Ceuta and West Africans after further exploration of the African coast. Barbary corsairs from North Africa, who enslaved Europeans from ships and coastal communities throughout the Mediterranean region, captured 1,200 people in Porto Santo in 1617.

Until the first half of the sixteenth century, Madeira was one of the major sugar markets of the Atlantic. Apparently it is in Madeira that, in the context of sugar production, slave labour was applied for the first time. The colonial system of sugar production was put into practice on the island of Madeira, on a much smaller scale, and later transferred, on a large scale, to other overseas production areas.

Later on, this small scale of production was completely outmatched by Brazilian and São Tomean plantations. Madeiran sugar production declined in such a way that it was not enough for domestic needs, so that sugar was imported to the island from other Portuguese colonies. Sugar mills were gradually abandoned, with few remaining, which gave way to other markets in Madeira. 

In the 17th century, as Portuguese sugar production was shifted to Brazil, São Tomé and Príncipe and elsewhere, Madeira's most important commodity product became its wine. Sugar plantations were replaced by vineyards, originating in the so-called ‘Wine Culture’, which acquired international fame and provided the rise of a new social class, the Bourgeoisie.

With the increase of commercial treaties with England, important English merchants settled on the Island and, ultimately, controlled the increasingly important island wine trade. The English traders settled in the Funchal as of the seventeenth century, consolidating the markets from North America, the West Indies and England itself. The Madeira Wine became very popular in the markets and it is also said to have been used in a toast during the Declaration of Independence by the Founding Fathers. In the eighteenth and nineteenth centuries, Madeira stands out for its climate and therapeutic effects. In the nineteenth century, visitors to the island integrated four major groups: patients, travellers, tourists and scientists. Most visitors belonged to the moneyed aristocracy.

As a result of a high demand for the season, there was a need to prepare guides for visitors. The first tourist guide of Madeira appeared in 1850 and focused on elements of history, geology, flora, fauna and customs of the island. Regarding hotel infrastructures, the British and the Germans were the first to launch the Madeiran hotel chain. The historic Belmond Reid's Palace opened in 1891 and is still open to this day.

The British first amicably occupied the island in 1801 whereafter Colonel William Henry Clinton became governor. A detachment of the 85th Regiment of Foot under Lieutenant-colonel James Willoughby Gordon garrisoned the island.
After the Peace of Amiens, British troops withdrew in 1802, only to reoccupy Madeira in 1807 until the end of the Peninsular War in 1814. In 1846 James Julius Wood wrote a series of seven sketches of the island. In 1856, British troops recovering from cholera, and widows and orphans of soldiers fallen in the Crimean War, were stationed in Funchal, Madeira.

World War I
During the Great War on 3 December 1916, a German U-boat, captained by Max Valentiner, entered Funchal harbour on Madeira. U-38 torpedoed and sank three ships, bringing the war to Portugal by extension. The ships sunk were:
 CS Dacia, a British cable-laying vessel. Dacia had previously undertaken war work off the coast of Casablanca and Dakar. It was in the process of diverting the German South American cable into Brest, France.
 SS Kanguroo, a French specialized "heavy-lift" transport.
 Surprise, a French gunboat. Her commander and 34 crewmen (including 7 Portuguese) were killed.

Batteries on Madeira returned fire and eventually forced U-38 to withdraw.

On 12 December 1917, two German U-boats, SM U-156 and SM U-157 (captained by Max Valentiner), again bombarded Funchal. This time the attack lasted around 30 minutes. The U-boats fired 40  shells. There were three fatalities and 17 wounded; a number of houses and Santa Clara church were hit.

The last Austrian Emperor, Charles I, was exiled to Madeira after the war. Determined to prevent an attempt to restore Charles to the throne, the Council of Allied Powers agreed he could go into exile on Madeira because it was isolated in the Atlantic and easily guarded. He died there on 1 April 1922 and his coffin lies in a chapel of the Church of Our Lady of Monte.

Geography

Madeira is on the same parallel as Bermuda a few time zones further west in the Atlantic. The two archipelagos are the only land in the Atlantic on the 32nd parallel north. The origins of the Tore-Madeira Ridge are not clearly established, but may have resulted from a morphological buckling of the lithosphere.

Islands and islets
 Madeira, including Ilhéu de Agostinho, Ilhéu de São Lourenço, Ilhéu Mole (northwest); Total population: 262,456 (2011 Census).
 Porto Santo, including Ilhéu de Baixo ou da Cal, Ilhéu de Ferro, Ilhéu das Cenouras, Ilhéu de Fora, Ilhéu de Cima; Total population: 5,483 (2011 Census).
 Desertas Islands, including the three uninhabited islands: Deserta Grande Island, Bugio Island and Ilhéu de Chão.
 Savage Islands, archipelago 280 km south-southeast of Madeira Island including three main islands and 16 uninhabited islets in two groups: the Northwest Group (Selvagem Grande Island, Ilhéu de Palheiro da Terra, Ilhéu de Palheiro do Mar) and the Southeast Group (Selvagem Pequena Island, Ilhéu Grande, Ilhéu Sul, Ilhéu Pequeno, Ilhéu Fora, Ilhéu Alto, Ilhéu Comprido, Ilhéu Redondo, Ilhéu Norte).

Madeira Island

The volcano formed atop an east–west rift in the oceanic crust along the African Plate, beginning during the Miocene epoch over 5 million years ago, continuing into the Pleistocene until about 700,000 years ago. This was followed by extensive erosion, producing two large amphitheatres open to south in the central part of the island. Volcanic activity later resumed, producing scoria cones and lava flows atop the older eroded shield. The most recent volcanic eruptions were on the west-central part of the island only 6,500 years ago, creating more cinder cones and lava flows.

It has a mountain ridge that extends along the centre of the island, reaching  at its highest point (Pico Ruivo), while much lower (below 200 metres) along its eastern extent. The primitive volcanic foci responsible for the central mountainous area, consisted of the peaks: Ruivo (1,862 m), Torres (1,851 m), Arieiro (1,818 m), Cidrão (1,802 m), Cedro (1,759 m), Casado (1,725 m), Grande (1,657 m), Ferreiro (1,582 m). At the end of this eruptive phase, an island circled by reefs was formed, its marine vestiges are evident in a calcareous layer in the area of Lameiros, in São Vicente (which was later explored for calcium oxide production). Sea cliffs, such as Cabo Girão, valleys and ravines extend from this central spine, making the interior generally inaccessible. Daily life is concentrated in the many villages at the mouths of the ravines, through which the heavy rains of autumn and winter usually travel to the sea.

Climate
Madeira has many different bioclimates.
Based on differences in sun exposure, humidity, and annual mean temperature, there are clear variations between north- and south-facing regions, as well as between some islands. In most winters snowfall occurs in the mountains of Madeira.

Flora and fauna

Madeira island is home to several endemic plant and animal species.
In the south, there is very little left of the indigenous subtropical rainforest that once covered the whole island (the original settlers set fire to the island to clear the land for farming) and gave it the name it now bears (Madeira means "wood" in Portuguese). However, in the north, the valleys contain native trees of fine growth. These "laurisilva" forests, called lauraceas madeirense, notably the forests on the northern slopes of Madeira Island, are designated as a World Heritage Site by UNESCO. The paleobotanical record of Madeira reveals that laurisilva forest has existed in this island for at least 1.8 million years. Critically endangered species such as the vine Jasminum azoricum and the rowan Sorbus maderensis are endemic to Madeira. The Madeiran large white butterfly was an endemic subspecies of the Large white which inhabited the laurisilva forests but has not been seen since 1977 so may now be extinct.

Madeiran wall lizard

The Madeiran wall lizard (Teira dugesii) is a species of lizard in the family Lacertidae. It is usually found in rocky places or among scrub and may climb into trees. It is also found in gardens and on the walls of buildings. It feeds on small invertebrates such as ants and also eats some vegetable matter. The tail is easily shed and the stump regenerates slowly. The colouring is variable and tends to match the colour of the animal's surroundings, being some shade of brown or grey with occasionally a greenish tinge. Most animals are finely flecked with darker markings. The underparts are white or cream, sometimes with dark spots, with some males having orange or red underparts and blue throats, but these bright colours may fade if the animal is disturbed. Females lay two to three clutches of eggs in a year with the juveniles being about  when they hatch.

Madeiran wolf spider 
Hogna ingens, the Deserta Grande wolf spider, is endemic to the Madeira archipelago, specifically Deserta Grande Island. It is critically endangered. It is considered the largest member of its family in the world. Efforts are underway to restore its population.

Endemic birds
Two species of birds are endemic to Madeira: the Trocaz pigeon and the Madeira firecrest. In addition to these are several extinct species which may have died out soon after the islands were settled: the Madeiran scops owl, two rail species, Rallus adolfocaesaris and R. lowei, and two quail species, Coturnix lignorum and C. alabrevis, and the Madeiran wood pigeon, a subspecies of the widespread common wood pigeon and which was last seen in the early 20th century.

Levadas

The island of Madeira is wet in the northwest, but dry in the southeast. In the 16th century the Portuguese started building levadas or aqueducts to carry water to the agricultural regions in the south. Madeira is very mountainous, and building the levadas was difficult and often convicts or slaves were used. Many are cut into the sides of mountains, and it was also necessary to dig  of tunnels, some of which are still accessible.

Today the levadas not only supply water to the southern parts of the island, but provide hydro-electric power. Some provide easy and relaxing walks through the countryside, but others are narrow, crumbling ledges where a slip could result in serious injury or death. Since 2011, some improvements have been made to these pathways, after the 2010 Madeira floods and mudslides on the island, to clean and reconstruct some critical parts of the island, including the levadas. Such improvements involved the continuous maintenance of the water streams, cementing the trails, and positioning safety fences on dangerous paths.

Two of the most popular levadas to hike are the Levada do Caldeirão Verde and the Levada do Caldeirão do Inferno, which should not be attempted by hikers prone to vertigo or without torches and helmets. The Levada do Caniçal is a much easier walk, running  from Maroços to the Caniçal Tunnel. It is known as the mimosa levada, because "mimosa" trees, (the colloquial name for invasive acacia) are found all along the route.

Politics

Political autonomy 
Due to its distinct geography, economy, social and cultural situation, as well as the historical autonomic aspirations of the Madeiran island population, the Autonomous Regions of Madeira was established in 1976. Although it is a politico-administrative autonomic region the Portuguese constitution specifies both a regional and national connection, obliging their administrations to maintain democratic principles and promote regional interests, while still reinforcing national unity.

As defined by the Portuguese constitution and other laws, Madeira possesses its own political and administrative statute and has its own government. The branches of Government are the Regional Government and the Legislative Assembly, the later being elected by universal suffrage, using the D'Hondt method of proportional representation.

The president of the Regional Government is appointed by the Representative of the Republic according to the results of the election to the legislative assemblies.

The sovereignty of the Portuguese Republic was represented in Madeira by the Minister of the Republic, proposed by the Government of the Republic and appointed by the President of the Republic. However, after the sixth amendment to the Portuguese Constitution was passed in 2006, the Minister of the Republic was replaced by a less-powerful Representative of the Republic who is appointed by the President, after listening to the Government, but otherwise it is a presidential prerogative. The other tasks of Representative of the Republic are to sign and order the publication of regional legislative decrees and regional regulatory decrees or to exercise the right of veto over regional laws, should these laws be unconstitutional.

Status within the European Union 
Madeira is also an Outermost Region (OMR) of the European Union, meaning that due to its geographical situation, it is entitled to derogation from some EU policies despite being part of the European Union.

According to the Treaty on the Functioning of the European Union, both primary and secondary European Union law applies automatically to Madeira, with possible derogations to take account of its "structural social and economic situation (...) which is compounded by their remoteness, insularity, small size, difficult topography and climate, economic dependence on a few products, the permanence and combination of which severely restrain their development". An example of such derogation is seen in the approval of the International Business Centre of Madeira and other state aid policies to help the rum industry.

It forms part of the European Union customs area, the Schengen Area and the European Union Value Added Tax Area.

Administrative divisions 

Funchal

Funchal is the capital and principal city of the Autonomous Region of Madeira, located along the southern coast of the island of Madeira. It is a modern city, located within a natural geological "amphitheatre" composed of vulcanological structure and fluvial hydrological forces. Beginning at the harbour (Porto de Funchal), the neighbourhoods and streets rise almost , along gentle slopes that helped to provide a natural shelter to the early settlers.

Population

Demographics

The island was settled by Portuguese people, especially farmers from the Minho region,<ref>{{cite web |url=CEHA: Madeira Vieira, O Infante e a Madeira: dúvidas e certezas, Centro Estudos História Atlântico |publisher=Ceha-madeira.net |access-date=30 July 2010 |url-status=dead |archive-url=https://web.archive.org/web/20100531222502/http://www.ceha-madeira.net/livros/infante.html |archive-date=31 May 2010}}</ref> meaning that Madeirans, as they are called, are ethnically Portuguese, though they have developed their own distinct regional identity and cultural traits.

About 247,000 (96%) of the population are Catholic and Funchal is the location of the Catholic cathedral.

Diaspora

Madeirans migrated to the United States, Venezuela, Brazil, Guyana, Saint Vincent and the Grenadines, South Africa and Trinidad and Tobago."Madeira and Emigration " Madeiran immigrants in North America mostly clustered in the New England and mid-Atlantic states, Toronto, Northern California, and Hawaii. The city of New Bedford is especially rich in Madeirans, hosting the Museum of Madeira Heritage, as well as the annual Madeiran and Luso-American celebration, the Feast of the Blessed Sacrament, the world's largest celebration of Madeiran heritage, regularly drawing crowds of tens of thousands to the city's Madeira Field.

In 1846, when a famine struck Madeira over 6,000 of the inhabitants migrated to British Guiana. In 1891 they numbered 4.3% of the population. In 1902 in Honolulu, Hawaii there were 5,000 Portuguese people, mostly Madeirans. In 1910 this grew to 21,000.

1849 saw an emigration of Protestant religious exiles from Madeira to the United States, by way of Trinidad and other locations in the West Indies. Most of them settled in Illinois with financial and physical aid of the American Protestant Society, headquartered in New York City. In the late 1830s the Reverend Robert Reid Kalley, from Scotland, a Presbyterian minister as well as a physician, made a stop at Funchal, Madeira on his way to a mission in China, with his wife, so that she could recover from an illness. The Rev. Kalley and his wife stayed on Madeira where he began preaching the Protestant gospel and converting islanders from Catholicism. Eventually, the Rev. Kalley was arrested for his religious conversion activities and imprisoned. Another missionary from Scotland, William Hepburn Hewitson, took on Protestant ministerial activities in Madeira. By 1846, about 1,000 Protestant Madeirenses, who were discriminated against and the subjects of mob violence because of their religious conversions, chose to immigrate to Trinidad and other locations in the West Indies in answer for a call for sugar plantation workers. The Madeiran exiles did not fare well in the West Indies. The tropical climate was unfamiliar and they found themselves in serious economic difficulties. By 1848, the American Protestant Society raised money and sent the Rev. Manuel J. Gonsalves, a Baptist minister and a naturalized U.S. citizen from Madeira, to work with the Rev. Arsénio da Silva, who had emigrated with the exiles from Madeira, to arrange to resettle those who wanted to come to the United States. The Rev. da Silva died in early 1849. Later in 1849, the Rev. Gonsalves was then charged with escorting the exiles from Trinidad to be settled in Sangamon and Morgan counties in Illinois on land purchased with funds raised by the American Protestant Society. Accounts state that anywhere from 700 to 1,000 exiles came to the United States at this time.

There are several large Madeiran communities around the world, such as the number in the UK, including Jersey, the Portuguese British community mostly made up of Madeirans celebrate Madeira Day.

Immigration
Madeira is part of the Schengen Area.

In December 2021, the largest foreign community was the Venezuelans (2443), followed by the British (1220), Brazilians (1013), Germans (890) and Italians (614). The Venezuelan community dramatically increased in number due to migration fueled by the socioeconomic crisis in Venezuela.

Economy
The gross domestic product (GDP) of the region was 4.9 billion euros in 2018, accounting for 2.4% of Portugal's economic output. GDP per capita adjusted for purchasing power was 22,500 euros or 75% of the EU27 average in the same year. The GDP per employee was 71% of the EU average.

Madeira International Business Center

The setting-up of a free trade zone, also known as the Madeira International Business Center (MIBC) has led to the installation, under more favorable conditions, of infrastructure, production shops and essential services for small and medium-sized industrial enterprises. The International Business Centre of Madeira comprises presently three sectors of investment: the Industrial Free Trade Zone, the International Shipping Register – MAR and the International Services. Madeira's tax regime has been approved by the European Commission as legal State Aid and its deadline has recently been extended by the E.C. until the end of 2027. The International Business Center of Madeira, also known as Madeira Free Trade Zone, was created formally in the 1980s as a tool of regional economic policy. It consists of a set of incentives, mainly of a tax nature, granted with the objective of attracting inward investment into Madeira, recognized as the most efficient mechanism to modernize, diversify and internationalize the regional economy. The decision to create the International Business Center of Madeira was the result of a thorough process of analysis and study. 

Since the beginning, favorable operational and fiscal conditions have been offered in the context of a preferential tax regime, fully recognized and approved by the European Commission in the framework of State aid for regional purposes and under the terms for the Ultra-peripheral Regions set in the Treaties, namely Article 299 of the Treaty on European Union. The IBC of Madeira has therefore been fully integrated in the Portuguese and EU legal systems and, as a consequence, it is regulated and supervised by the competent Portuguese and EU authorities in a transparent and stable business environment, marking a clear difference from the so-called "tax havens" and "offshore jurisdictions", since its inception. In 2015, the European Commission authorized the new state aid regime for new companies incorporated between 2015 and 2020 and the extension of the deadline of the tax reductions until the end of 2027. The present tax regime is outlined in Article 36°-A of the Portuguese Tax Incentives Statute. Available data clearly demonstrates the contribution that this development programme has brought to the local economy over its 20 years of existence: impact in the local labor market, through the creation of qualified jobs for the young population but also for Madeiran professionals who have returned to Madeira thanks to the opportunities now created; an increase in productivity due to the transfer of know how and the implementation of new business practices and technologies; indirect influence on other sectors of activity: business tourism benefits from the visits of investors and their clients and suppliers, and other sectors such as real estate, telecommunications and other services benefit from the growth of their client base; impact on direct sources of revenue: the companies attracted by the IBC of Madeira represent over 40% of the revenue in terms of corporate income tax for the Government of Madeira and nearly 3.000 jobs, most of which qualified, among other benefits. Also there are above average salaries paid by the companies in the IBC of Madeira in comparison with the wages paid in the other sectors of activity in Madeira.

 Regional government 
Madeira has been a significant recipient of European Union funding, totaling up to €2 billion. In 2012, it was reported that despite a population of just 250,000, the local administration owes some €6 billion. Furthermore, the Portuguese treasury (IGCP) assumed Madeira's debt management between 2012 and 2015. The region continues to work with the central government on a long-term plan to reduce its debt levels and commercial debt stock. Moody's notes that the region has made significant fiscal consolidation efforts and that its tax revenue collection has increased significantly in recent years due to tax rate hikes. Madeira's tax revenues increased by 41% between 2012 and 2016, helping the region to reduce its deficit to operating revenue ratio to 10% in 2016 from 77% in 2013.

Tourism

Tourism is an important sector in the region's economy, contributing 20% to the region's GDP, providing support throughout the year for commercial, transport and other activities and constituting a significant market for local products. The share in Gross Value Added of hotels and restaurants (9%) also highlights this phenomenon. The island of Porto Santo, with its  beach and its climate, is entirely devoted to tourism.

Visitors are mainly from Europe, with Portuguese, British, German and French tourists providing the main contingents (2021). The average annual occupancy rate was 60.3% in 2008, reaching its maximum in March and April, when it exceeds 70%.

 Whale watching 
Whale watching has become very popular in recent years. Many species of dolphins, such as common dolphin, spotted dolphin, striped dolphin, bottlenose dolphin, short-finned pilot whale, and whales such as Bryde's whale, Sei whale, fin whale, sperm whale, beaked whales can be spotted near the coast or offshore.

Energy
Electricity on Madeira is provided solely through EEM (Empresa de Electricidade da Madeira, SA, which holds a monopoly for the provision of electrical supply on the autonomous region) and consists largely of fossil fuels, but with a significant supply of seasonal hydroelectricity from the levada system, wind power and a small amount of solar. Energy production comes from conventional thermal and hydropower, as well as wind and solar energy. The Ribeira dos Soccoridos hydropower plant, rated at 15MW utilises a pumped hydropower reservoir to recycle mountain water during the dry summer.

In 2011, renewable energy formed 26.5% of the electricity used in Madeira. By 2020, half of Madeira's energy will come from renewable energy sources. This is due to the planned completion of the Pico da Urze / Calheta pumped storage hydropower plant, rated at 30MW.

Battery technologies are being tested to minimise Madeira's reliance on fossil fuel imports. Renault SA and EEM piloted the Sustainable Porto Santo—Smart Fossil Free Island project on Porto Santo to demonstrate how fossil fuels can be entirely replaced with renewable energy, using a 3.3 MWh battery. Madeira operates a 15 MW 1-hour lithium iron phosphate battery with black start capability.

Transport

The islands have two airports, Cristiano Ronaldo International Airport and Porto Santo Airport, on the islands of Madeira and Porto Santo respectively. From Cristiano Ronaldo International Airport the most frequent flights are to Lisbon. There are also direct flights to over 30 other airports in Europe and nearby islands.

Transport between the two main islands is by plane, or ferries from the Porto Santo Line, the latter also carrying vehicles. Visiting the interior of the islands is now easy thanks to construction of the Vias Rápidas, major roads that cross the island. Modern roads reach all points of interest on the islands.

Funchal has an extensive public transportation system. Bus companies, including Horários do Funchal, which has been operating for over a hundred years, have regularly scheduled routes to all points of interest on the island.

Culture
Music

Emigrants from Madeira also influenced the creation of new musical instruments. In the 1880s, the ukulele was created, based on two small guitar-like instruments of Madeiran origin, the cavaquinho and the rajão. The ukulele was introduced to the Hawaiian Islands by Portuguese immigrants from Madeira and Cape Verde. Three immigrants in particular, Madeiran cabinet makers Manuel Nunes, José do Espírito Santo, and Augusto Dias, are generally credited as the first ukulele makers. Two weeks after they disembarked from the SS Ravenscrag in late August 1879, the Hawaiian Gazette reported that "Madeira Islanders recently arrived here, have been delighting the people with nightly street concerts."

Cuisine

Because of the geographic situation of Madeira in the Atlantic Ocean, the island has an abundance of fish of various kinds. The species that are consumed the most are espada (black scabbardfish), blue fin tuna, white marlin, blue marlin, albacore, bigeye tuna, wahoo, spearfish, skipjack tuna and many others are found in the local dishes as they are found along the coast of Madeira. Espada is usually fried in a batter and accompanied by fried banana and sometimes a passionfruit sauce.Bacalhau is also popular, as it is in Portugal.

There are many different meat dishes on Madeira, one of the most popular being espetada. Espetada is traditionally made of large chunks of beef rubbed in garlic, salt and bay leaf and marinated for 4 to 6 hours in Madeira wine, red wine vinegar and olive oil then skewered onto a bay laurel stick and left to grill over smouldering wood chips. These are so integral a part of traditional eating habits that a special iron stand is available with a T-shaped end, each branch of the "T" having a slot in the middle to hold a brochette (espeto in Portuguese); a small plate is then placed underneath to collect the juices. The brochettes are very long and have a V-shaped blade in order to pierce the meat more easily. It is usually accompanied with the local bread called bolo do caco. A traditional holiday dish is "Carne de Vinho e Alhos", which is most closely associated with the pig slaughter that was held a few weeks before Christmas. A big event, traditionally it was attended by everyone in the village. The dish is made of pork which marinates for three days in white wine, vinegar, salt, and pepper and is then cooked with small potatoes, sliced carrots, and turnip. Another common meat dish is “Picado" - cubed beef cooked in a mushroom sauce and accompanied by french fries.

Other popular dishes in Madeira include açorda, feijoada and carne de vinha d'alhos.

Traditional pastries in Madeira usually contain local ingredients, one of the most common being mel de cana, literally "sugarcane honey" (molasses). The traditional cake of Madeira is called Bolo de Mel, which translates as (Sugarcane) "Honey Cake" and according to custom, is never cut with a knife, but broken into pieces by hand. It is a rich and heavy cake. The cake commonly known as "Madeira cake" in England is named after Madeira wine.

Malasadas are a local confection which are mainly consumed during the Carnival of Madeira. Pastéis de nata, as in the rest of Portugal, are also very popular.

Milho frito is a popular dish in Madeira that is similar to the Italian dish polenta fritta. Açorda Madeirense is another popular local dish.

Madeira is known for the high quality of its cherimoya fruits. The Annona Festival is traditional and held annually in the parish of Faial. This event encourages the consumption of this fruit and its derivatives, such as liqueurs, puddings, ice cream and smoothies.

 Beverages 

Madeira is a fortified wine, produced in the Madeira Islands; varieties may be sweet or dry. It has a history dating back to the Age of Exploration when Madeira was a standard port of call for ships heading to the New World or East Indies. To prevent the wine from spoiling, neutral grape spirits were added. However, wine producers of Madeira discovered, when an unsold shipment of wine returned to the islands after a round trip, that the flavour of the wine had been transformed by exposure to heat and movement. Today, Madeira is noted for its unique winemaking process that involves heating the wine and deliberately exposing the wine to some levels of oxidation. Most countries limit the use of the term Madeira to those wines that come from the Madeira Islands, to which the European Union grants Protected designation of origin (PDO) status.

A local beer called Coral is produced by the Madeira Brewery, which dates from 1872. It has achieved 2 Monde Selection Grand Gold Medals, 24 Monde Selection Gold Medals and 2 Monde Selection Silver Medals. Other alcoholic drinks are also popular in Madeira, such as the locally created Poncha, Niquita, Pé de Cabra, Aniz, as well as Portuguese drinks such as Macieira Brandy, Licor Beirão.

Laranjada is a type of carbonated soft drink with an orange flavour, its name being derived from the Portuguese word laranja'' ("orange"). Launched in 1872 it was the first soft drink to be produced in Portugal, and remains very popular to the present day. Brisa drinks, a brand name, are also very popular and come in a range of flavours.

There is a coffee culture in Madeira.

Sports

Football is the most popular sport in Madeira and the island was indeed the first place in Portugal to host a match, organised by British residents in 1875. The island is the birthplace of international star Cristiano Ronaldo and is home to two prominent Primeira Liga teams, C.S. Marítimo  and C.D. Nacional.

As well as football, the island is also home to professional sports teams in basketball (CAB Madeira) and handball (Madeira Andebol SAD, who were runners up in the 2019 European Challenge Cup). Madeira was also the host of the 2003 World Handball Championship.

The Rally Vinho da Madeira is a rally race held annually since 1959, considered one of the biggest sporting events on the island It was part of the European Rally Championship from 1979 to 2012 and the Intercontinental Rally Challenge from 2006 to 2010.

Other popular sporting activities include golf at one of the island's two courses (plus one on Porto Santo), surfing, scuba diving, and hiking.

Sister provinces
Madeira Island has the following sister provinces:
 Aosta Valley, Italy (1987)
 Jersey (1998)
 Eastern Cape, South Africa
 Jeju Province, South Korea (2007)
 Gibraltar (2009)

Postage stamps

Portugal has issued postage stamps for Madeira during several periods, beginning in 1868.

See also

 "Have Some Madeira M'Dear"
 Geology of Madeira
 List of birds of Madeira
 Madeira Islands Open, an annual European Tour golf tournament
 Surfing in Madeira
Islands of Macaronesia
Azores
Cabo Verde
Canary Islands

References

Bibliography

External links 

 World History Encyclopedia - The Portuguese Colonization of Madeira
 
 Madeira's Government Website
 
 

 
 
1420s establishments in the Portuguese Empire
1976 disestablishments in the Portuguese Empire
1976 establishments in Portugal
Autonomous Regions of Portugal
Integral overseas territories
Islands of Macaronesia
North Africa
Outermost regions of the European Union
Populated places established in the 1420s
States and territories established in 1976
Volcanoes of Portugal
Wine regions of Portugal
Islands of Africa